Bear trap or beartrap may refer to:

Technology
A type of foothold trap meant to catch bears
Cable bindings, a type of ski binding
Beartrap (hauldown device), a device that allows helicopter to land on small flight decks in bad weather
A physiotherapy device for trigger pointing and rolling out muscles.

Other uses
The Soviet–Afghan War, where "bear" refers to the "Soviet bear"
Beartrap Creek, a river in Wisconsin
A trio of holes (15, 16, 17), named after golfer and course designer Jack Nicklaus, at the Champion Course of the PGA National Golf Club
A sudden reversal in a bear market which forces short sellers to take a loss covering their positions.